William Emerson Barrett (December 29, 1858 – February 12, 1906) was an American journalist and politician.

Barrett was a founder of The Boston Evening Record, and served as a member of the Massachusetts House of Representatives and as a United States representative from Massachusetts.

Barrett was born in Melrose, Massachusetts on December 29, 1858.  He attended public schools, and graduated from Dartmouth College in 1880. He was assistant editor of the St. Albans Daily Messenger, then joining the staff of The Boston Daily Advertiser.  He was Washington correspondent of the newspaper 1882-1886. He was recalled to Boston to become editor in chief. In 1888 Barrett was promoted to chief proprietor and manager of The Boston Daily Advertiser and The Boston Evening Record.

Barrett was a member of the Massachusetts House of Representatives from 1887–1892 and served as speaker the last five years.  He was elected as a Republican to the Fifty-fourth and Fifty-fifth Congresses (March 4, 1895 – March 3, 1899).  He declined to be a candidate for renomination in 1898, and returned to Boston and resumed active management of his newspaper interests.  Barrett served as president of the Union Trust Co. of Boston.

Barrett died of pneumonia in West Newton, Massachusetts on February 12, 1906.  His interment was in Newton Cemetery.

See also
 110th Massachusetts General Court (1889)
 111th Massachusetts General Court (1890)
 113th Massachusetts General Court (1892)
 114th Massachusetts General Court (1893)

Notes

External links

Bibliography

 Gifford, Stephen Nye.: A Manual for the Use of the General Court  (1889) p. 451.
 Hill, Edwin Charles.: The Historical Register A Record of People Places And Events in American History (1921) pp. 12-14.
 The National Cyclopaedia of American Biography: Being the History of the United States as Illustrated in the Lives of the Founders, Builders, and Defenders of the Republic, and of the Men and Women who are Doing the Work and Moulding the Thought of the Present Time.; J. T. White company (1910) p. 172.
 The New York Times (February 13, 1906) Death List of A Day.; William Emerson Barrett (1906), P. 7.

See also
Massachusetts State House
Massachusetts Senate
Massachusetts General Court
Massachusetts Government
List of speakers of the Massachusetts House of Representatives

Republican Party members of the Massachusetts House of Representatives
Dartmouth College alumni
People from Melrose, Massachusetts
19th-century American newspaper editors
American male journalists
Boston Daily Advertiser people
1858 births
1906 deaths
Deaths from pneumonia in Massachusetts
Republican Party members of the United States House of Representatives from Massachusetts
19th-century American male writers
19th-century American politicians